Zeritis pulcherrima is a butterfly in the family Lycaenidae. It is found in Sudan and the Central African Republic.

References

External links
Die Gross-Schmetterlinge der Erde 13: Die Afrikanischen Tagfalter. Plate XIII 69 h

Butterflies described in 1923
Aphnaeinae